The 2nd Hong Kong Film Awards presentation ceremony, honored the best films of 1982 and took place in Hong Kong Baptist University, Academic Community Hall, Kowloon Tong, Hong Kong on 31 August 1983 at 8pm. The ceremony was hosted by Eric Ng and Zhan Xiaoping, during the ceremony awards are presented in 13 categories. The ceremony was sponsored by Sing Tao Newspapers Limited and City Entertainment Magazine.

Awards
Winners are listed first, highlighted in boldface, and indicated with a double dagger.

References

External links
 Official website of the Hong Kong Film Awards

1983
1982 film awards
1983 in Hong Kong